CD-35 was a C Type class escort ship (Kaibōkan) of the Imperial Japanese Navy during the Second World War.

History
CD-35 was laid down by Nippon Kokan K. K. at their Tsurumi Shipyard on 5 May 1944, launched on 3 September 1944, and completed and commissioned on 11 October 1944. During the war CD-35 was mostly busy on escort duties.

On 12 January 1945, off Cape Paderan in the South China Sea, CD-35 was attacked and sunk after receiving three direct bomb hits by aircraft from the USS Lexington (CV-16), USS Hancock (CV-19) and USS Hornet (CV-12) which were then part of Vice Admiral John S. McCain, Sr.'s Task Force 38 that had entered the South China Sea to raid Japanese shipping. 69 crewman were killed.

CD-35 was struck from the Navy List on 10 March 1945.

References

Additional sources

1944 ships
Ships built in Japan
Type C escort ships
Maritime incidents in January 1945
World War II shipwrecks in the Sea of Japan
Ships sunk by US aircraft